The Bluebirds of Happiness Tried to Land on My Shoulder is the fifth solo album by Guided by Voices member Tobin Sprout, released in 2010. The name references the "bluebird of happiness" idiom.

Track listing 
Side A
 Pretty- 2:48
 She's on Mercury- 2:59
 Apple of My Eye- 3:54
 You Make My World Go Down- 2:45
 Wedding Song- 3:40

Side B
 Soul Superman- 2:19
 It's Just the Way- 3:19
 Casubury Bridge- 3:55
 Fix on the Races- 5:28
 Field in May- 3:28

References

2010 albums
Tobin Sprout albums